A lingam (lit. "sign, symbol or mark"), sometimes referred to as linga or Shiva linga, is an abstract or aniconic representation of the Hindu god Shiva in Shaivism.  It is typically the primary murti or devotional image in Hindu temples dedicated to Shiva, also found in smaller shrines, or as self-manifested natural objects. It is often represented within a disc-shaped platform, the yoni – its feminine counterpart, consisting of a flat element, horizontal compared to the vertical lingam, and designed to allow liquid offerings to drain away for collection.  Together, they symbolize the merging of microcosmos and macrocosmos, the divine eternal process of creation and regeneration, and the union of the feminine and the masculine that recreates all of existence.

The original meaning of lingam as "sign" is used in Shvetashvatara Upanishad, which says "Shiva, the Supreme Lord, has no liūga", liuga meaning he is transcendental, beyond any characteristic and, specifically, the sign of gender. Lingam is regarded as the "outward symbol" of the "formless Reality", the symbolization of merging of the 'primordial matter' (Prakṛti)  with the 'pure consciousness' (Purusha) in transcendental context.

The metaphorical creative principle of lingam-yoni, the union of the feminine and the masculine, the eternal cosmological process of creation is also depicted in Chinese philosophy of Yin and Yang, where etymologically and  semantically Yin represents the feminine, half-unity of consciousness and Yang denotes the masculine, the other half, together symbolizing the entirety or unity-consciousness in the creation.  The lingam is conceptualized both as an emblem of generative and destructive power, particularly in the esoteric Kaula and Tantra practices, as well as the Shaivism and Shaktism traditions of Hinduism.

"Lingam" is found in Sanskrit texts, such as Shvetashvatara Upanishad, Samkhya, Vaisheshika and others texts with the meaning of "evidence, proof" of God and God's existence, or existence of formless Brahman. Lingam iconography found at archaeological sites of the Indian subcontinent and southeast Asia includes simple cylinders set inside a yoni; mukhalinga rounded pillars with carvings such as of one or more mukha (faces); and anatomically realistic representations of a phallus such as on the Gudimallam Lingam. In the Shaiva traditions, the lingam is regarded as a form of spiritual iconography.

Nomenclature and significance

Lingam, states Monier Monier-Williams, appears in the Upanishads and epic literature, where it means a "mark, sign, emblem, characteristic". Other contextual meanings of the term include "evidence, proof, symptom" of God and God's power. The term also appears in early Indian texts on logic, where an inference is based on a sign (linga), such as "if there is smoke, there is fire" where the linga is the smoke. It is a religious symbol in Hinduism representing Shiva as the generative power, all of existence, all creativity and fertility at every cosmic level.
 
The lingam of the Shaivism tradition is a short cylindrical pillar-like symbol of Shiva, made of stone, metal, gem, wood, clay or precious stones. According to Encyclopædia Britannica, the lingam is a votary aniconic object found in the sanctum of Shiva temples and private shrines that symbolizes Shiva and is "revered as an emblem of generative power". It often is found within a lipped, disked structure that is an emblem of goddess Shakti and this is called the yoni. Together they symbolize the union of the feminine and the masculine principles, and "the totality of all existence", states Encyclopædia Britannica.

According to Alex Wayman, given the Shaiva philosophical texts and spiritual interpretations, various works on Shaivism by some Indian authors "deny that the linga is a phallus". To the Shaivites, a linga is neither a phallus nor do they practice the worship of erotic penis-vulva, rather the linga-yoni is a symbol of cosmic mysteries, the creative powers and the metaphor for the spiritual truths of their faith. For example, according to Swami Sivananda, the corelation of the linga and phallus is wrong; the Lingam is only the external symbol of Lord Shiva's formless being. He further states that it is the light or power of consciousness, manifesting from Sadashiva.

According to Sivaya Subramuniyaswami, the lingam signifies three perfections of Shiva. The upper oval part of the Shivalingam represents Parashiva and lower part of the Shivalingam, called the pitha, represents Parashakti. In Parashiva perfection, Shiva is the absolute reality, the timeless, formless and spaceless. In Parashakti perfection, Shiva is all-pervasive, pure consciousness, power and primal substance of all that exists and it has form unlike Parashiva which is formless.
According to Rohit Dasgupta, the lingam symbolizes Shiva in Hinduism, and it is also a phallic symbol. Since the 19th century, states Dasgupta, the popular literature has represented the lingam as the male sex organ. This view contrasts with the traditional abstract values they represent in Shaivism wherein the lingam-yoni connote the masculine and feminine principles in the entirety of creation and all existence.

According to Sivananda Saraswati, Siva Lingam speaks unmistakable language of silence: "I am one without a second, I am formless". Siva Lingam is only the outward symbol of formless being, Lord Siva, who is eternal, ever-pure, immortal essence of this vast universe, who is your innermost Self or Atman, and who is identical with the Supreme Brahman, states Sivananda Saraswati.

Scholars, such as Wendy Doniger and Rohit Dasgupta, view linga as extrapolations of what was originally a phallic symbol. This interpretation is criticized by Stella Kramrisch and Moriz Winternitz who opines that the linga in the Shiva tradition is "only a symbol of the productive and creative principle of nature as embodied in Shiva", and it has no historical trace in any obscene phallic cult.

History

Archeological finds from Indus Valley civilisation

According to Chakrabarti, "some of the stones found in Mohenjodaro are unmistakably phallic stones". These are dated to some time before 2300 BCE. Similarly, states Chakrabarti, the Kalibangan site of Harappa has a small terracotta representation that "would undoubtedly be considered the replica of a modern Shivlinga [a tubular stone]." According to Encyclopædia Britannica, while Harappan discoveries include "short cylindrical pillars with rounded tops", there is no evidence that the people of Indus Valley Civilization worshipped these artifacts as lingams. According to Srinivasan, in the Harappan sites, objects that resemble "lingam" have been found. That includes "a seated trident-headed ithyphallic figure", which was found on Indus seals, "has been compared to Shiva as meditating ascetic", states Srinivasan.

The colonial-era archaeologists John Marshall and Ernest Mackay proposed that certain artifacts found at Harappan sites may be evidence of yoni-linga worship in Indus Valley Civilization. Scholars such as Arthur Llewellyn Basham dispute whether such artifacts discovered at the archaeological sites of Indus Valley sites are yoni. For example, Jones and Ryan state that lingam/yoni shapes have been recovered from the archaeological sites at Harappa and Mohenjo-daro, part of the Indus Valley civilisation. In contrast, Indologist Wendy Doniger states that this relatively rare artifact can be interpreted in many ways and has unduly been used for wild speculations such as being a linga. Another Indus stamp seal often called the Pashupati seal, states Doniger, has an image with a general resemblance with Shiva and "the Indus people may well have created the symbolism of the divine phallus", but given the available evidence we cannot be certain, nor do we know that it had the same meaning as some currently project them to might have meant.

According to the Indologist Asko Parpola, "it is true that Marshall's and Mackay's hypotheses of linga and yoni worship by the Harappans has rested on rather slender grounds, and that for instance, the interpretation of the so-called ring-stones as yonis seems untenable". He quotes Dales 1984 paper, which states "with the single exception of the unidentified photography of a realistic phallic object in Marshall's report, there is no archaeological evidence to support claims of special sexually-oriented aspects of Harappan religion". However, adds Parpola, a re-examination at Indus Valley sites suggest that the Mackay's hypothesis cannot be ruled out because erotic and sexual scenes such as ithyphallic males, naked females, a human couple having intercourse and trefoil imprints have now been identified at the Harappan sites. The "finely polished circular stand" found by Mackay may be yoni although it was found without the linga. The absence of linga, states Parpola, maybe because it was made from wood which did not survive.

Shvetashvatara Upanishad
Shvetashvatara Upanishad states that, of the three significations of Lingam, the primary one is "the imperishable Purusha", the absolute reality, whereby the linga is "sign", a mark that provides the existence of Brahman, which is itself formless. Furthermore, it mentioned that Shiva is transcendent, beyond any characteristic or liūga, specifically the sign of gender. Linga, "sign", not only signifies the existence of perceptible "things" but also denotes the imperceptible essence of "a thing" or pieces of Brahman called Atma even before that thing has come to exist in any concrete form. The imperceptible essence of "a thing", in its potentiality, is the liūga of the thing. 

The insight of the Shvetashvatara Upanishad conveyed through the word liūga is formulated explicitly in Samkhya and schools of Yoga or ways of looking at things, that is, looking at their appearance and at Ultimate Reality. Liriga here denotes the subtle body, (liṇga śarīra) underlying and ontologically preceding anything perceptible. The perceptible state, in this context, is the gross body (sthūla śarīra), or concrete reality as it appears to the sense organs. In between the Ultimate and concrete reality is Prakṛti, also called Pradhana which is the imperceptible substratum of the manifest world or pre-matter. Out of this imperceptible cosmic substance, all things have come out, and to which they will return ultimately.

The three Gunas are Sattva, Rajas, and Tamas. The function as tendencies through the principles and powers of cosmic substance cohere are Buddhi, "cosmic intelligence or revelation"; Ahamkara, "individuation"; and Manas, "Mind". From these evolve the power (Indriya) of cognition that enables hearing, feeling, seeing, tasting, and smelling and their corresponding subtle elements to exist. From these supersensible (Tanmatras), the sense particulars (Mahābhūta) come into being. They are Ether or space (Akasha), air (Vayu), fire (Agni), water (Ap), and earth (Bhumi), the Pancha Bhootas. They are the vehicles of the Tanmatras, and constitute the gross body of concrete, perceptible, and particularized reality. The Subtle body (liṇga śarīra) is the subtle prototype of the gross body, the imperceptible stuff of energy by which all phenomena are projected into concrete reality, like fire from its latency. The subtle body, itself changeless, accompanies the life-of-the-individual (Jiva) through the cycles of birth and deaths and is finally reabsorbed into the principles and powers of which it was composed of.

Linga Purana

The Linga Purana states, "Shiva is signless, without color, taste, smell, that is beyond word or touch, without quality, motionless and changeless". The source of the universe is the signless, and all of the universe is the manifested Linga, a union of unchanging principle and the ever changing nature. The Linga Purana and Siva Gita texts builds on this foundation. Linga, states Alain Daniélou, means sign. It is an important concept in Hindu texts, wherein Linga is a manifested sign and nature of someone or something. It accompanies the concept of Brahman, which as invisible signless and existent Principle, is formless or linga-less.

Vedic literature
The word lingam is not found in the Rigveda, or the other Vedas. However, Rudra (proto-Shiva) is found in the Vedic literature. Worship of the lingam was not a part of the Vedic religion. The worship of the lingam originated from the famous hymn in the Atharva Veda Samhita sung in praise of the Yupa-Stambha, the sacrificial post. In that hymn, a description is found of the beginningless and endless Stambha or Skambha, and it is shown that the said Skambha is put in place of the eternal Brahman. Just as the Yajna (sacrificial) fire, its smoke, ashes, and flames, the Soma plant, and the ox that used to carry on its back the wood for the Vedic sacrifice gave place to the conceptions of the brightness of Shiva's body, his tawny matted hair, his blue throat, and the riding on the bull of the Shiva, the Yupa-Skambha gave place in time to the Shiva-Linga. In the text Linga Purana, the same hymn is expanded in the shape of stories, meant to establish the glory of the great Stambha and the superiority of Shiva as Mahadeva.

There is a hymn in the Atharvaveda that praises a pillar (stambha), and this is one possible origin of linga worship. According to Swami Vivekananda, the Shiva-linga had origins in the idea of Yupa-Stambha or Skambha of the Vedic rituals, where the term meant the sacrificial post which was then idealized as the eternal Brahman. The Yupa-Skambha gave place in time to the Shiva-Linga, quite possibly with influence from Buddhism's stupa shaped like the top of a stone linga, according to Vivekananda.

Early iconography and temples

It has been dated to the 3rd-century BCE, or to the 2ndcentury BCE, and is mostly accepted to be from the 3rd- to 1st-century BCE,  though some later dates have been proposed. The stone lingam is clearly a representation of an anatomically accurate phallus, with a figure of Lakulisha, the ascetic manifestation of Shiva, carved on the front, holding an antelope and axe in his hands. He stands on top of a Apasmara (demon) dwarf, who symbolizes spiritual ignorance, greed, sensual desires or Kama and nonsensical speech on the spiritual path, hence must be subdued in spiritual pursuits. 

In this earliest representation, the phallic representation illustrates of the centrality of the energetic principle of Urdhva Retas (lit. "ascent of vital energies or fluid") the upward flow of energy in spiritual pursuits and practice of celibacy (Brahmacarya), contrary to fertility or release of vital energies. Lakulisa as an ascetic manifestation of Shiva is seen in later peninsular Indian scriptures whose ithyphallic aspects connotes asceticism and conserved procreative potentialities (Brahmacarya or celibacy), rather than mere eroticism. According to Stella Kramrisch, the pictorial symbol of the Gudimallam lingam should not be mistaken for fertility or sexuality due to incomplete or impure understanding of the underlying refined principles.

The Bhita linga – now at the Lucknow museum – is also dated to about the 2nd century BCE, and has four directional faces on the pillar and a Brahmi script inscription at the bottom. Above the four faces, the Bhita linga has the bust of a male with his left hand holding a vase and the right hand in the abhaya (no-fear) mudra. The pillar itself is, once again, a realistic depiction of phallus but neither symbolizes fertility nor sexuality, but the refined energetic principles of Urdhva Retas during Sannyasa or Asceticism.

The Mathura archaeological site has revealed similar lingams, with a standing Shiva in front (2nd century CE) and with one or four faces around the pillar (1st to 3rd century CE).

Numerous stone and cave temples from the mid to late 1st millennium feature lingams. The Bhumara Temple near Satna Madhya Pradesh, for example, is generally dated to late 5th-century Gupta Empire era, and it features an Ekamukha Lingam.

Mahabharata
According to Wendy Doniger, lingam in the Mahabharata is represented as the phallic form which suggests Sthula sarira of Shiva, although not the primary significance, however it connotes much more than that. The anthropomorphic shape, in this specific context, functions as the "subtle body" (Lińga Śarīra) of Shiva in the Mahabharata. It is a superabundant evocation of fierce potency on a cosmic scale, although it states crassly phallic. Doniger further finds that Shiva was called by many names, including Rudra or the Lord of the Mountain. Chapter 10.17 of the Mahabharata also refers to the word sthanu in the sense of an "inanimate pillar" as well as a "name of Shiva, signifying the immobile, ascetic, desexualized form of the lingam", as it recites the legend involving Shiva, Brahma and Prajapati. This mythology weaves two polarities, one where the lingam represents the potentially procreative phallus (fertile lingam) and its opposite "a pillar-like renouncer of sexuality" (ascetic lingam), states Doniger.

Puranas
According to Shiva Purana, the legend about the origin of the phallic form of Shiva is that some brahmin devotees of Shiva were highly engrossed in the meditation of Shiva. In the meantime, Shiva came in a hideous naked ascetic form with ashes smeared all over his body holding his phallus, to test the devotion of his devotees. The wives of the sages were scared at this sight but some embraced the holy ascetic. Although Shiva put them to test, the sages and wives did not recognize him. The sages were stupefied and deluded by Śiva's power of illusion, māyā, became infuriated at this sight and cursed ascetic form of Shiva

“You are acting pervertedly. This violates the Vedic path. Hence let your penis fall on the ground.”

Although the sages were also ascetics, only because they observed established conventions, they failed when Shiva tested them with his outrageous ways. The purpose of Shiva's visit to the hermitage, the place where the sages were living with their wives, was to enlighten the false sages by allowing them to humiliate him. But the sages were lost in anger, but Shiva allowed himself to be humiliated in the image that met the eye of the sages. Even though Shiva excited some of them as the source of their desire, they were unable to see him as the killer of desires. Although Shiva revealed his true nature by his dance (Tandava), yet so great was his power of illusion (māyā), the deluded sages did not recognize him. That falling phallus burnt everything in front; wherever it went it began to burn everything there. It went to all three Hindu worlds (hell, heaven, earth). All the worlds and the people were distressed. The sages couldn't recognise it as Shiva and sought refuge from Brahma.

Brahma answered that they should pray to Parvati to assume a form of vaginal passage, and perform a procedure reciting vedic mantras and decorating the penis with flowers etc., so that the penis would become steady. As the phallus was held by Parvati in that form, an auspicion arrow formed. The pedestal shaped as the vagina and the phallus fixed therein are symbolic of the eternal creative forces personified as Śivā and Śiva. After the procedure was completed, the penis became static. This phallus was known as "hatesa" and "Siva Siva". In one version of the story found in Vamana Purana, Shiva's visit to the hermitage in Deodar forests was an act of grace at Parvati's request.

The Shiva Purana also describes the origin of the lingam, known as Shiva-linga, as the beginning-less and endless cosmic pillar (Stambha) of fire, the cause of all causes. Shiva is pictured as emerging from the lingamthe cosmic pillar of fireproving his superiority over the gods Brahma and Vishnu. It also describes right way to worship Shiva linga in its 11th chapter in detail  This is known as Lingodbhava. The Linga Purana also supports this interpretation of lingam as a cosmic pillar, symbolizing the infinite nature of Shiva. According to the Linga Purana, the lingam is a complete symbolic representation of the formless Universe Bearerthe oval-shaped stone is the symbol of the Universe, and the bottom base represents the Supreme Power that holds the entire Universe in it. A similar interpretation is also found in the Skanda Purana: "The endless sky (that great void which contains the entire universe) is the Linga, the Earth is its base. At the end of time the entire universe and all the Gods finally merge in the Linga itself." In the Linga Purana, an Atharvaveda hymn is expanded with stories about the great Stambha and the supreme nature of Mahâdeva (the Great God, Shiva).

Other literature

In early Sanskrit medical texts, linga means "symptom, signs" and plays a key role in the diagnosis of a sickness, the disease. The author of classical Sanskrit grammar treatise, Panini, states that the verbal root ling which means "paint, variegate", has the sense "that which paints, variegates, characterizes". Panini as well as Patanjali additionally mention lingam with the contextual meaning of the "gender".

In the Vaisheshika Sutras, it means "proof or evidence", as a conditionally sufficient mark or sign. This Vaisheshika theory is adopted in the early Sanskrit medical literature. Like the Upanishads, where linga means "mark, sign, characteristic", the texts of the Nyaya school of Hindu philosophy use linga in the same sense. In the Samkhya sutras, and in Gaudapada's commentary on Samkhyakarika, the term linga has many contextual meanings such as in verses 1.124.136, 3.9.16 and 5.21.61, as it develops its theory of the nature of Atman (Self) and Sarira (body, prakriti) and its proposed mechanism of rebirth. In the Purva Mimamsa Sutra and the Vedanta sutra, as well as the commentaries on them, the term linga appears quite often, particularly in the form of "lingadarsanacca" as a form of citing or referencing prior Hindu literature. This phrase connotes "[we have found an] indicative sign", such as the "indicative sign is in a Vedic passage".

According to Doniger, there is persuasive evidence in later Sanskrit literature that the early Indians associated the lingam icon with the male sexual organ; the 11th-century Kashmir text Narmamala by Kshemendra on satire and fiction writing explains his ideas on parallelism with divine lingam and human lingam in a sexual context. Various Shaiva texts, such as the Skanda Purana in section 1.8 states that all creatures have the signs of Shiva or Shakti through their lingam (male sexual organ) or pindi (female sexual organ). According to Doniger, a part of the literature corpus regards lingam to be the phallus of Shiva, while another group of texts does not. Sexuality in the former is inherently sacred and spiritual, while the latter emphasizes the ascetic nature of Shiva and renunciation to be spiritual symbolism of lingam. This tension between the pursuit of spirituality through householder lifestyle and the pursuit of renunciate sannyasi lifestyle is historic, reflects the different interpretations of the lingam and what lingam worship means to its devotees. It remains a continuing debate within Hinduism to this day, states Doniger. To one group, it is a part of Shiva's body and symbolically saguna Shiva (he in a physical form with attributes). To the other group, it is an abstract symbol of nirguna Shiva (he in the universal Absolute Reality, formless, without attributes). In Tamil Shaiva tradition, for example, the common term for lingam is kuRi or "sign, mark" which is asexual. Similarly, in Lingayatism tradition, the lingam is a spiritual symbol and "was never said to have any sexual connotations", according to Doniger. To some Shaivites, it symbolizes the axis of the universe.

The term linga also appears in Buddhist and Jaina literature, where it means "sign, evidence" in one context, or "subtle body" with sexual connotations in another.

Muslim rule
In the 11th-century, after conquests of the subcontinent by Muslim rulers, several sultans of Delhi, often iconoclastic, regarded the lingam as sexual and anthropomorphic, and ordered as many be destroyed as possible. In some situations, linga were deliberately laid at the thresholds of mosques for public usage and incorporated into Islamic architecture, notably at a mosque in Banbhore.

Orientalist literature

The colonial era Orientalists and Christian missionaries, raised in the Victorian mold where sex and sexual imagery were a taboo subject, were shocked by and were hostile to the lingam-yoni iconography and reverence they witnessed. The 19th and early 20th-century colonial and missionary literature described lingam-yoni, and related theology as obscene, corrupt, licentious, hyper-sexualized, puerile, impure, demonic and a culture that had become too feminine and dissolute. To the Hindus, particularly the Shaivites, these icons and ideas were the abstract, a symbol of the entirety of creation and spirituality. The colonial disparagement in part triggered the opposite reaction from Bengali nationalists, who more explicitly valorised the feminine. Swami Vivekananda called for the revival of the Mother Goddess as a feminine force, inviting his countrymen to "proclaim her to all the world with the voice of peace and benediction".

According to Wendy Doniger, the terms lingam and yoni became explicitly associated with human sexual organs in the western imagination after the widely popular first Kamasutra translation by Sir Richard Burton in 1883. In his translation, even though the original Sanskrit text does not use the words lingam or yoni for sexual organs, and almost always uses other terms, Burton adroitly avoided being viewed as obscene to the Victorian mindset by avoiding the use of words such as penis, vulva, vagina and other direct or indirect sexual terms in the Sanskrit text to discuss sex, sexual relationships and human sexual positions. Burton used the terms lingam and yoni instead throughout the translation. This conscious and incorrect word substitution, states Doniger, thus served as an Orientalist means to "anthropologize sex, distance it, make it safe for English readers by assuring them, or pretending to assure them, that the text was not about real sexual organs, their sexual organs, but merely about the appendages of weird, dark people far away." Similar Orientalist literature of the Christian missionaries and the British era, states Doniger, stripped all spiritual meanings and insisted on the Victorian vulgar interpretation only, which had "a negative effect on the self-perception that Hindus had of their own bodies" and they became "ashamed of the more sensual aspects of their own religious literature". Some contemporary Hindus, states Doniger, in their passion to spiritualize Hinduism and for their Hindutva campaign have sought to sanitize the historic earthly sexual meanings, and insist on the abstract spiritual meaning only.

Iconography and worship

The traditional lingam rituals in major Shiva temples includes offerings of flowers, grass, dried rice, fruits, leaves, water and a milk bath. Priests chant hymns, while the devotees go to the sanctum for a darshana followed by a clockwise circumambulation of the sanctum. On the sanctum walls, typically are reliefs of Dakshinamurti, Brahma and Vishnu. Often, near the sanctum are other shrines, particularly for Shakti (Durga), Ganesha and Murugan (Kartikeya). In the Hindu tradition, special pilgrimage sites include those where natural lingams are found in the form of cylindrical rocks or ice or rocky hill. These are called Svayambhuva lingam, and about 70 of these are known on the Indian subcontinent, the most significant being one in Kashi (Varanasi) followed by Prayaga, Naimisha and Gaya.

The historic lingam iconography has included:
Mukhalingam, where the lingam has the face of Shiva carved on it. An Ekmukha lingam has just one face, Chaturmukha lingam has four faces in the cardinal directions, while a Panchamukha lingam has a total of five (the fifth is on the top) and represents Sadashiva. Among the mukha-lingam varieties, the four face version are more common.
Ashtottara-sata linga, where 108 miniature lingas are carved on the pujabhaga (main linga) following certain geometric principles.

Sahasra linga, where 1001 miniature lingas are carved on the pujabhaga (main linga) following certain geometric principles (set in 99 vertical lines, 11 horizontal).
Dhara linga, where lingas have five to sixty four fluted facets, with prime numbers and multiples of four particularly favored.
Lingodbhavamurti, where Shiva is seen as emerging from within a fiery lingam. On top of this icon is sometimes a relief of a swan or goose representing Brahma, and a boar at the bottom representing the Varaha avatar of Vishnu. This reflects the Shaiva legend describing a competition between Brahma, Shiva and Vishnu, as to who has priority and superiority.

A lingam may be made of clay, metal, precious stone, wood, stone (most common), or a disposal material. The construction method, proportions and design is described in Shaiva Agama texts. The lingam is typically set in the center of a pindika (also called yoni or pithas, symbolizing Shakti). A pindika may be circular, square, octagonal, hexagonal, duodecagonal, sixteen sided, elliptical, triangular or another shape. Some lingams are miniaturized and they are carried on one's person, such as by Lingayats in a necklace. These are called chala-lingams. The Hindu temple design manuals recommend geometric ratios for the linga, the sanctum and the various architectural features of the temple according to certain mathematical rules it considers perfect and sacred. Anthropologist Christopher John Fuller states that although most sculpted images (murtis) are anthropomorphic or theriomorphic, the aniconic Shiva Linga is an important exception.

According to Shaiva Siddhanta, the linga is the ideal substrate in which the worshipper should install and worship the five-faced and ten-armed Sadāśiva, the form of Shiva who is the focal divinity of that school of Shaivism.

The various styles of lingam iconography are found on the Indian subcontinent and southeast Asia.

Lingayatism 

Lingayats wear a lingam inside a necklace, called Ishtalinga. Initially known as Veerashaivas (heroic worshippers of Shiva), since the 18th century adherents of this faith are known as Lingayats. This tradition originated in Karnataka around the 12th-century. Lingayatism is derived from the term linga and suffix ayta. The  is a personalized and miniature oval-shaped linga and an emblem of their faith symbolising Parashiva, the absolute reality and their spirituality. It is viewed as a "living, moving" divinity within the Lingayat devotee. Every day, the devotee removes this personal linga from its box, places it in left palm, offers puja and then meditates about becoming one with the linga, in his or her journey towards the atma-linga.

Pilgrimage sites 
An ice lingam at Amarnath in the western Himalayas forms every winter from ice dripping on the floor of a cave and freezing like a stalagmite. It is very popular with pilgrims.

In Kadavul Temple, a 700-pound, 3-foot-tall, naturally formed Sphatika (quartz) lingam is installed. In the future, this crystal lingam will be housed in the Iraivan Temple. It is claimed as among the largest known sphatika self formed (Swayambhu) lingams. Hindu scripture rates crystal as the highest form of Siva lingam.

Shivling, is a mountain in Uttarakhand (the Garhwal region of Himalayas). It arises as a sheer pyramid above the snout of the Gangotri Glacier. The mountain resembles a Shiva lingam when viewed from certain angles, especially when travelling or trekking from Gangotri to Gomukh as part of a traditional Hindu pilgrimage.

A lingam is also the basis for the formation legend (and name) of the Borra Caves in Andhra Pradesh.

Banalinga are the lingam which are found on the bed of the Narmada river.

Lesser known Bhooteshwarnath Mahadeva in Gariaband district of Chhattisgarh is a rock Shivlinga and said to be the Largest Natural Shivlinga in the world., whose height is increasing with each passing year.

The tallest Shiva lingam in the world is located at Chenkal village in Thiruvananthapuram district in the state of Kerala, India.

Gallery

See also

 Banalinga
 Hindu iconography
 Indiana Jones and the Temple of Doom - a Lingam stone plays a central part in the film's plot
 Jyotirlinga
 Lingayatism
 Mukhalingaj
 Gudimallam Lingam
 Pancharamas
 Shaligram
 Spatika Lingam

Notes

References

Bibliography
 Basham, A. L. The Wonder That Was India: A survey of the culture of the Indian Sub-Continent before the coming of the Muslims, Grove Press, Inc., New York (1954; Evergreen Edition 1959).
 
 Chakravarti, Mahadev. The Concept of Rudra-Śiva Through the Ages, Delhi: Motilal Banarasidass (1986), .
 
 
 

 Drabu, V.N. Śaivāgamas: A Study in the Socio-economic Ideas and Institutions of Kashmir (200 B.C. to A.D. 700), New Delhi: Indus Publishing (1990), .
 
 
 
 Includes Śivasahasranāmakoṣa, a dictionary of names. This work compares eight versions of the Śivasahasranāmāstotra. The preface and introduction (in English) by Ram Karan Sharma provide an analysis of how the eight versions compare with one another. The text of the eight versions is given in Sanskrit.
 Schumacher, Stephan and Woerner, Gert. The Encyclopedia of Eastern Philosophy and Religion, Buddhism, Taoism, Zen, Hinduism, Shambhala, Boston, (1994) .

External links

Some interesting Linga images from Kalanjara and Ajaigarh, SK Sullerey (1980)
O, that Linga!, Alex Wayman (1987)
Linga and Yoni worship, Urmila Agrawal (1995)
A note on the Linga with Sakti images in Bengal Art, KD Gupta (2011)

Forms of Shiva
Shaivism
Objects used in Hindu worship
Hindu symbols
Hindu iconography
Hindu philosophical concepts
Shiva in art
Gender and Hinduism
Phallic symbols